A linea is any long marking, dark or bright, on a planet or moon's surface.

Linea may also refer to:

 Fiat Linea, small family car released in 2007
 Linea (Stargate), character in the TV series
 Línea Spanish customary units
Anatomy
 Linea alba (abdomen), fibrous structure that runs down the midline of the abdomen
 Linea alba (cheek), horizontal streak on the mucosal surface of the cheek
 Linea aspera, ridge of roughened surface on the posterior aspect of the femur
 Linea nigra, dark vertical line that appears on the abdomen during pregnancy
 Linea semilunaris, curved tendinous line placed one on either side of the rectus abdominis. 
 Linea terminalis or innominate line, consists of the pectineal line, the pubic crest and the arcuate line.

See also
 La Linea (disambiguation)
 Linea 77, Italian nu metal band formed in 1993
 Buccinulum linea linea, lined whelk
 Linea Søgaard-Lidell, Danish politician